Pen y Brynfforchog is subsidiary summit of Glasgwm in North Wales forming part of the Aran range in southern Snowdonia.

It is separated from Glasgwm by the pass, Bwlch y Fign. The summit is bare and marked by a few stones. The views to the Dyfi hills: include direct view of the Craig Portas ridge, with Maesglase and Cribin Fawr.

References

Brithdir and Llanfachreth
Mawddwy
Mountains and hills of Gwynedd
Mountains and hills of Snowdonia
Hewitts of Wales
Nuttalls